Syntenin-1 is a protein that in humans is encoded by the SDCBP gene.

Function 

The protein encoded by this gene was initially identified as a molecule linking syndecan-mediated signaling to the cytoskeleton. The syntenin protein contains tandemly repeated PDZ domains that bind the cytoplasmic, C-terminal domains of a variety of transmembrane proteins. This protein may also affect cytoskeletal-membrane organization, cell adhesion, protein trafficking, and the activation of transcription factors. The protein is primarily localized to membrane-associated adherens junctions and focal adhesions but is also found at the endoplasmic reticulum and nucleus. Alternative splicing results in multiple transcript variants encoding different isoforms.

Interactions 

SDCBP has been shown to interact with:
 EFNB1, 
 GRIK1, 
 GRIK2,
 Interleukin 5 receptor alpha subunit, 
 Merlin, 
 RAB5A, 
 SOX4, 
 TRAF6, 
 ULK1. and
 ERICH2

References

Further reading